Hypnotised is a 1980 album released by The Undertones. The album, the second of four released by the band, was recorded at Wisseloord Studios in the Netherlands in December 1979, and at Eden Studios in London in January 1980, with the majority of the songs to appear on the album being written between March and December 1979. In addition, although the primary lyrical concern of the songs upon this album focused upon teenage angst, boisterousness, and heartbreak (as had been the case with their debut album), several of the songs upon Hypnotised are notably both lyrically and musically more sophisticated than material released upon The Undertones.

Produced by Roger Bechirian between December 1979 and January 1980, Hypnotised was released on 21 April 1980, reaching number 6 in the UK Albums Charts and making Hypnotised the highest-charting album of their career.

The original release of Hypnotised included two singles: "My Perfect Cousin", which was released on 28 March 1980 and reached number 9 in the charts; and "Wednesday Week", released on 5 July 1980 and which charted at number 11 three weeks later.

Cover photography
The photograph chosen to adorn the front cover of Hypnotised was taken by Damian O'Neill, and depicts the band's bassist Michael Bradley and drummer Billy Doherty. The image itself was taken at a seafood restaurant in the Bowery, where the band had been taken for a meal by the manager of Sire Records, Seymour Stein, on their first tour of America in September 1979.

Critical reception

A May 1980 review published in Billboard described the album as "a sprightly collection of 15 short and punchy songs that convey a sense of humor, catchy melodies and lyrics that standout above your average rock fare" and noted that "the vocal intensity gives the songs its streetwise urban kick and the biting guitar riffs cushion the lyrics with the kind of support that calls attention to each song".

In July 1980, Ira Robbins of rock and roll fanzine Trouser Press stated: "Hypnotised is a wonderful album. [The album contains] clever lyrics and great hooks that make the LP a thoroughly entertaining affair. Their songs are uncomplicated and unpretentious; not aesthetic benchmarks on the state of the world."

Hypnotised was listed in 1001 Albums You Must Hear Before You Die; a poll selected and written by 90 leading international music critics.

Track listing

Sides one and two were combined as tracks 1–15 on CD and download reissues.

Note
"Under the Boardwalk" was a cover of The Drifters' 1964 single.

Personnel
The Undertones
 Feargal Sharkey - lead vocals
 John O'Neill - guitar, vocals
 Damian O'Neill - guitar, keyboards, vocals
 Michael Bradley - bass, keyboards (on "See That Girl"), vocals
 Billy Doherty - drums
Technical
Neill King, Peter Bobr - engineer
Aldo Bocca, Roger Bechirian - mixing on "What's With Terry?"
Bush Hollyhead, Damian O'Neill, Michael Bradley - sleeve

References

External links

Official website of The Undertones
Yourirish.com profile of The Undertones

1980 albums
Albums produced by Roger Bechirian
Rykodisc albums
Sire Records albums
The Undertones albums